Orehovica  may refer to:

 Orehovica, Međimurje County, a village and municipality in Croatia
 Orehovica, Krapina-Zagorje County, a village near Bedekovčina, Croatia
 Orehovica (Rijeka), a suburb of Rijeka, Croatia
 Orehovica interchange on the Croatian motorway A6
 Orehovica, Vipava, a village in Slovenia
 Orehovica, Zagorje ob Savi, a village in Slovenia
 Orehovica, Šentjernej, a village in Slovenia

See also
 Orahovica, a town in Virovitica-Podravina County, Croatia